Ryan Chew (born August 12, 1996) is an American badminton player. He won the 2021 Pan Am Championships doubles with his brother Phillip Chew. He trains at the Orange County Badminton Club, which is founded by his grandfather, Don Chew. He competed at the 2020 Tokyo Summer Games.

Achievements

Pan American Games 
Men's doubles

Pan Am Championships 
Men's doubles

BWF International Challenge/Series 
Men's doubles

References

1996 births
Living people
Sportspeople from Orange County, California
American sportspeople of Chinese descent
American male badminton players
Badminton players at the 2020 Summer Olympics
Olympic badminton players of the United States
Badminton players at the 2019 Pan American Games
Pan American Games silver medalists for the United States
Pan American Games medalists in badminton
Medalists at the 2019 Pan American Games